Hullabaloo Soundtrack, also known as simply Hullabaloo, is a compilation and live album by English rock band Muse. The album is a double album with disc one containing previously released B-sides and  disc two acting as the soundtrack to their live video Hullabaloo: Live at Le Zenith, Paris, which documented the band's performances at Le Zénith in Paris, France, on 28 and 29 October 2001. It was released alongside the live video on 1 July 2002 via Taste and Mushroom records.

Track listing

Notes
A sample of Tom Waits's "What's He Building?" can be heard in disc two's pregap (length: 1:53). On later digital editions, the sample is placed at the beginning of track no. 1
The intro of Rachmaninov's 'Prelude in C Sharp Minor "The Bells of Moscow"' is played at the beginning of disc two's track no. 7.

Personnel
Matthew Bellamy – lead vocals, lead guitar, piano, synthesizers
Chris Wolstenholme – bass guitar, rhythm guitar, backing vocals, synthesizers
Dominic Howard – drums, percussion

Charts and certifications

Weekly charts

Year-end charts

Certifications

References

Notes

Muse (band) live albums
Albums produced by John Leckie
B-side compilation albums
2002 compilation albums
2002 live albums
Concert film soundtracks